The 1978 WBF World Championships took place in November 1978 in Bangkok, Thailand. This event was followed by Invitational Championships which took place in the month of February earlier this year in Hong Kong. It was the first of the two editions of the world championships organised by the WBF, which was a rival organisation of the Badminton World Federation.

Participating nations

Medalists

Results

Semifinals

Finals

Remarks 
Women's doubles and Mixed doubles bronze medalists unknown.

References

External links 
https://eresources.nlb.gov.sg/newspapers/Digitised/Article/straitstimes19781109-1.2.114.2
https://eresources.nlb.gov.sg/newspapers/Digitised/Article/straitstimes19781108-1.2.139.2

World Championships
Badminton, World Championships
Badminton, World Championships
World Championships
World Championships
BWF World Championships
Badminton, World Championships